or  is a village in Narvik Municipality in Nordland county, Norway. The village population has decreased significantly in the last 20 years, so now there are only a few residents living in Storå. The local economy consists of agriculture and fishing. There are ferry connections from here to the villages of Kjøpsvik and Drag.

References

Narvik
Villages in Nordland
Populated places of Arctic Norway